Omar Davis, known by their stage name Moore Kismet, is a DJ, songwriter, and music producer. Moore Kismet is currently signed with Thrive Music and Universal Music Group.

Career 
In 2021, Kismet became the youngest artist ever to perform at EDC Las Vegas.

Personal life 
Kismet is non-binary.

Discography 
2019
 "Opposites"
 "Tokyo"
 "Mutant (with Sharps)"
 "Escape"

2020
 "Adore (with Leotrix)"
 "Duplex (with Voltra)"
 "Self-Expression"

2021
 "Rumor (featuring Wyn)"
"Vendetta for Cupid (featuring Tygko)"
"Autonomy (featuring Torr)"
"Flourish (with Laxcity)"
"Call of the Unicorn (featuring Tasha Baxter)"

2022
 "Parallel Heartbreak (featuring Pauline Herr)"
 "Hold Up (with Whipped Cream, Big Freedia and Uniiqu3)"
 "Universe"
 Progress (Interlude)
 See You Go (feat. Courtney Paige Nelson)
I Miss You More Than You Think (feat. Lunamatic)
Wasteland

References 

Living people
Trap musicians (EDM)
American record producers
American electronic musicians
Non-binary musicians
Remixers
2004 births
Electronic dance music DJs